Psorospermum febrifugum is a flowering plant species in the genus Psorospermum occurring in Africa. It grows in open woodland over a wide range of altitudes. The inconspicuous flowers are fragrant, creamy-white and some 8mm in diameter. The fruit is a small berry some 6mm in diameter and bright red when mature.

This plant contains xanthones like sporospermin.

References

External links

Flora of Zimbabwe image gallery Psorospermum febrifugum

febrifugum